Jeffrey Benjamin Wendelken (born March 24, 1993) is an American professional baseball pitcher for the Yokohama DeNA BayStars of Nippon Professional Baseball (NPB). He previously played in Major League Baseball (MLB) for the Oakland Athletics and Arizona Diamondbacks.

Career

Boston Red Sox
Wendelken was drafted by the Boston Red Sox in the 13th round of the 2012 MLB draft out of Middle Georgia College. He made his professional debut with the Gulf Coast League Red Sox, posting a 1.27 ERA in 13 appearances. He began the 2013 season with the Single-A Greenville Drive, and recorded a 2.77 ERA in 27 games for the team.

Chicago White Sox
On July 30, 2013, he was acquired by the Chicago White Sox in a trade that had Wendelken, Avisail García, Frankie Montas, and Cleuluis Rondon going to the White Sox, Jake Peavy and Brayan Villarreal going to the Red Sox, and José Iglesias going to the Detroit Tigers. He finished the year split between the High-A Winston-Salem Dash and the Single-A Kannapolis Intimidators. In 2014, Wendelken remained in Winston-Salem for the entire year, registering a 7-10 record and 5.25 ERA in 27 games. In 2015, he split the season between the Double-A Birmingham Barons and the Triple-A Charlotte Knights, pitching to a 6-2 record and 3.20 ERA between the two clubs. The White Sox added him to their 40-man roster after the 2015 season.

Oakland Athletics
On December 9, 2015, Wendelken was traded to the Oakland Athletics, along with Zachary Erwin, for infielder Brett Lawrie.

In 2016, he was assigned to the Triple-A Nashville Sounds to begin the season. On May 8, 2016, he was recalled by the Athletics and made his MLB debut that night. He went back and forth between Nashville and Oakland for the rest of the season before being outrighted to Triple-A on October 6, 2016. Wendelken did not play in a game in 2017 after he underwent Tommy John surgery.

In 2018, he began the season at Triple-A. His contract was purchased by the Athletics on July 14, 2018. In 2019, Wendelken was one of four Athletics pitchers to throw 30 innings with a sub 4.00 ERA, joining Liam Hendriks, Yusmeiro Petit, and Ryan Buchter. In 2020, Wendelken recorded 31 strikeouts in 25 innings and an ERA of 1.80 in 21 games. In 26 appearances for the Athletics is 2021, Wendelken posted a 4.32 ERA with 26 strikeouts. On August 10, 2021, Wendelken was designated for assignment by the Athletics.

Arizona Diamondbacks
On August 11, 2021, Wendelken was claimed off of waivers by the Arizona Diamondbacks. On July 5, 2022, the Diamondbacks designated Wendelken for assignment.

Yokohama DeNA BayStars
On November 27, 2022, Wendelken signed with the Yokohama DeNA BayStars of Nippon Professional Baseball.

References

External links

1993 births
Living people
Arizona Diamondbacks players
Baseball players from Savannah, Georgia
Birmingham Barons players
Charlotte Knights players
Glendale Desert Dogs players
Greenville Drive players
Gulf Coast Red Sox players
Kannapolis Intimidators players
Major League Baseball pitchers
Middle Georgia Warriors baseball players
Nashville Sounds players
Oakland Athletics players
United States national baseball team players
Winston-Salem Dash players